Tira may refer to:

Places
Place names derived from the word in Hebrew or Aramaic for 'fort' or 'castle', often confounded with the Arabic for tair (bird).
 At Tiri, a village in Lebanon;  SWP 4
 Al-Tira, Haifa, a village in the Haifa District, depopulated in 1948;  SWP 5
 Al-Tira, Baysan, a village in the Beisan District, depopulated in 1948;  SWP 9
 Tira, Israel, a city in Israel; SWP 11
 Al-Tira (Ramla), a village in the Ramla District, depopulated in 1948;  SWP 14
 at-Tira (Ramallah), a Palestinian village in Ramallah and al-Bireh Governorate;  on SWP 17

Other places
 Tira, Texas, a town in Texas, United States
 Tira Sujanpur, a town in India
 Ţîra and Ţîra station, villages in Ghindeşti, Floreşti, Moldova

Ethnic group and language
 Tira people, an ethnic group in Sudan
 Tira language, a Niger-Congo language in the Heiban family

People with the surname 
 Olia Tira, an East German-born Moldovan singer

Other
 Tira (Soulcalibur), a fictional character in the Soul series of fighting games
 TIRA (System), a radar in Germany
 Traditional IRA, an individual retirement account
 PS TIRA, an Indonesian football club

See also
 
 Tyra (disambiguation)
 Tireh (disambiguation)